Francis Seymour-Conway may refer to:

 Francis Seymour-Conway, 1st Baron Conway (1679–1732), Member of Parliament for Bramber
 Francis Seymour-Conway, 1st Marquess of Hertford (1718–1794), Lord Lieutenant of Ireland and Lord Chamberlain
 Francis Ingram-Seymour-Conway, 2nd Marquess of Hertford (1743–1822), Chief Secretary for Ireland and Lord Chamberlain
 Francis Seymour-Conway, 3rd Marquess of Hertford (1777–1842), Vice-Chamberlain of the Household

See also
 Francis Seymour (disambiguation)
 Francis Conway (disambiguation)